Jacques Gruppi, born in Villeneuve-sur-Lot, on 6 April 1941) is a French former rugby league  player, who played as centre. His brothers are Raymond Gruppi, who also was a rugby league player and Pierre Gruppi, a former rugby union player.

Biographie 
He played for Villeneuve-sur-Lot and also represented France  during the 1968 Rugby League World Cup, where he played also in the final lost against Australia.

Outside the sport, he worked as a salesman.

Between 1985 and 1986, Gruppi coached his former club, Villeneuve-sur-Lot.

Honours 

 Rugby league :
 World Cup :
 1 time runner-up in 1968 (France).
 French Championship :
 1-time champion in 1964 (Villeneuve-sur-Lot).
 1 time finalist in 1965 (Villeneuve-sur-Lot).
 Lord Derby Cup :
 1-time champion in 1964 (Villeneuve-sur-Lot).
 4 times finalist in 1966, 1969, 1970 and 1972 (Villeneuve-sur-Lot).

International caps

Cap details

References 

France national rugby league team players
French rugby league players
1941 births
Living people
Sportspeople from Lot-et-Garonne
Rugby league centres
Villeneuve Leopards players